Tschudi's yellow-shouldered bat (Sturnira oporaphilum) is a species of leaf-nosed bat indigenous to Argentina, Ecuador, and Peru, with its range also encompassing Bolivia.

References

Mammals described in 1844
Mammals of Argentina
Mammals of Bolivia
Mammals of Ecuador
Mammals of Peru
Sturnira